St. Joseph Cathedral is a Catholic cathedral located in downtown Baton Rouge, Louisiana, United States. It is the mother church of the Diocese of Baton Rouge, and it was listed on the National Register of Historic Places on March 22, 1990.

History
St. Joseph Parish was founded as the Parroquia de Nuestra Señora de los Dolores in 1792; its name was changed some time after Louisiana became a State in 1812 as English became more and more the language of the population in Baton Rouge. The present church building, the Parish's third, was begun in 1853.  The church was designated the cathedral church of the Diocese of Baton Rouge by Pope John XXIII in the bull of erection "Peramplum Novae Aureliae" dated July 22, 1961; the erection of the diocese took place on November 8, 1961, with Most Rev. Robert Emmet Tracy as is first bishop.  The church building underwent a significant interior renovation in 1967 and was re-dedicated on September 30, 1970.

See also

List of tallest buildings in Baton Rouge
List of Catholic cathedrals in the United States
List of cathedrals in the United States
National Register of Historic Places listings in East Baton Rouge Parish, Louisiana

References

External links

Official Cathedral Site
Roman Catholic Diocese of Baton Rouge Official Site

Religious organizations established in 1792
Roman Catholic churches completed in 1855
Roman Catholic cathedrals in Louisiana
Gothic Revival church buildings in Louisiana
Churches in Baton Rouge, Louisiana
Churches on the National Register of Historic Places in Louisiana
National Register of Historic Places in Baton Rouge, Louisiana
1792 establishments in North America
19th-century Roman Catholic church buildings in the United States